Management Development Research Foundation (MDRF) is a public trust that promotes research on issues revolving around inter-disciplinary interface of management, social sciences and public policy. MDRF aims to foster opportunities for young scholars for public discourse, create a body of knowledge, and disseminate  research. MDRF organizes conferences and publishes journals.

MDRF has organized three national conferences on Human Resource Management since 2010. It organized a national conference on Knowledge Management in 2011 and a national conference on Politics & Governance in 2013.

Journals published by MDRF include Journal of Management & Public Policy, Review of HRM, Review of Management, Review of Knowledge Management and Journal of Politics & Governance.

References

External links

Journal of Management & Public Policy
Think tanks based in India